In enzymology, a galactarate O-hydroxycinnamoyltransferase is an enzyme that catalyzes the chemical reaction

feruloyl-CoA + galactarate  CoA + O-feruloylgalactarate

Thus, the two substrates of this enzyme are feruloyl-CoA and galactarate, whereas its two products are CoA and O-feruloylgalactarate.

This enzyme belongs to the family of transferases, specifically those acyltransferases transferring groups other than aminoacyl groups.  The systematic name of this enzyme class is feruloyl-CoA:galactarate O-(hydroxycinnamoyl)transferase. This enzyme is also called galacturate hydroxycinnamoyltransferase.

References

 

EC 2.3.1
Enzymes of unknown structure